This is a list of factorial and binomial topics in mathematics.  See also binomial (disambiguation).

Abel's binomial theorem
Alternating factorial
Antichain
Beta function
Bhargava factorial
Binomial coefficient
Pascal's triangle
Binomial distribution
Binomial proportion confidence interval
Binomial-QMF (Daubechies wavelet filters)
Binomial series
Binomial theorem
Binomial transform
Binomial type
Carlson's theorem
Catalan number
Fuss–Catalan number
Central binomial coefficient
Combination
Combinatorial number system
De Polignac's formula
Difference operator
Difference polynomials
Digamma function
Egorychev method
Erdős–Ko–Rado theorem
Euler–Mascheroni constant
Faà di Bruno's formula
Factorial
Factorial moment
Factorial number system
Factorial prime
Gamma distribution
Gamma function
Gaussian binomial coefficient
Gould's sequence
Hyperfactorial
Hypergeometric distribution
Hypergeometric function identities
Hypergeometric series
Incomplete beta function
Incomplete gamma function
Jordan–Pólya number
Kempner function
Lah number
Lanczos approximation
Lozanić's triangle
Macaulay representation of an integer
Mahler's theorem
Multinomial distribution
Multinomial coefficient, Multinomial formula, Multinomial theorem 
Multiplicities of entries in Pascal's triangle
Multiset
Multivariate gamma function
Narayana numbers
Negative binomial distribution
Nörlund–Rice integral
Pascal matrix
Pascal's pyramid
Pascal's simplex
Pascal's triangle
Permutation
List of permutation topics
Pochhammer symbol (also falling, lower, rising, upper factorials)
Poisson distribution
Polygamma function
Primorial
Proof of Bertrand's postulate
Sierpinski triangle
Star of David theorem
Stirling number
Stirling transform
Stirling's approximation
Subfactorial
Table of Newtonian series
Taylor series
Trinomial expansion
Vandermonde's identity
Wilson prime
Wilson's theorem
Wolstenholme prime

Factorial and binomial topics